The men's 65 kg competition in judo at the 1984 Summer Olympics in Los Angeles was held on 5 August at the California State University. The gold medal was won by Yoshiyuki Matsuoka of Japan.

Results

Pool A

Pool B

Repechages

Final

Final classification

References

Judo at the 1984 Summer Olympics
Judo at the Summer Olympics Men's Half Lightweight